Are We There Yet? is the first album released by Christian rapper John Reuben.  It was released on May 9, 2000, and features the song "Do Not", which was the first song that Reuben made into a music video.

Track listing
"Divine Inspiration" (feat. Alon Auguste)—5:32
"Do Not"—4:05
"No Regrets"—5:44
"Him Her He She"—4:33
"X-Ray"—5:12
"Gather In"—4:35
"Rest Easy"—4:57
"Hello Ego"—4:26
"Jezebel"—4:41
"Draw Near"—4:36
"Identify" 4:14
"Place To Be" 4:33
"God Is Love" (featuring tobyMac) -- 4:09

References

2000 debut albums
John Reuben albums
Gotee Records albums